In number theory, primes in arithmetic progression are any sequence of at least three prime numbers that are consecutive terms in an arithmetic progression.

According to the Green–Tao theorem, there exist arbitrarily long sequences of primes in arithmetic progression. Sometimes the phrase may also be used about primes which belong to an arithmetic progression which also contains composite numbers. For example, it can be used about primes in an arithmetic progression of the form , where a and b are coprime which according to Dirichlet's theorem on arithmetic progressions contains infinitely many primes, along with infinitely many composites.

For integer k ≥ 3, an AP-k (also called PAP-k) is any sequence of k primes in arithmetic progression. An AP-k can be written as k primes of the form a·n + b, for fixed integers a (called the common difference) and b, and k consecutive integer values of n. An AP-k is usually expressed with n = 0 to k − 1. This can always be achieved by defining b to be the first prime in the arithmetic progression.

Properties 
Any given arithmetic progression of primes has a finite length. In 2004, Ben J. Green and Terence Tao settled an old conjecture by proving the Green–Tao theorem: The primes contain arbitrarily long arithmetic progressions. It follows immediately that there are infinitely many AP-k for any k.

If an AP-k does not begin with the prime k, then the common difference is a multiple of the primorial k# = 2·3·5·...·j, where j is the largest prime ≤ k.
Proof: Let the AP-k be a·n + b for k consecutive values of n. If a prime p does not divide a, then modular arithmetic says that p will divide every pth term of the arithmetic progression. (From H.J. Weber, Cor.10 in ``Exceptional Prime Number Twins, Triplets and Multiplets," arXiv:1102.3075[math.NT]. See also Theor.2.3 in ``Regularities of Twin, Triplet and Multiplet Prime Numbers," arXiv:1103.0447[math.NT], Global J.P.A.Math 8(2012), in press.) If the AP is prime for k consecutive values, then a must therefore be divisible by all primes p ≤ k.
This also shows that an AP with common difference a cannot contain more consecutive prime terms than the value of the smallest prime that does not divide a.

If k is prime then an AP-k can begin with k and have a common difference which is only a multiple of (k−1)# instead of k#. (From H. J. Weber, ``Less Regular Exceptional and Repeating Prime Number Multiplets," arXiv:1105.4092[math.NT], Sect.3.) For example, the AP-3 with primes {3, 5, 7} and common difference 2# = 2, or the AP-5 with primes {5, 11, 17, 23, 29} and common difference 4# = 6. It is conjectured that such examples exist for all primes k. , the largest prime for which this is confirmed is k = 19, for this AP-19 found by Wojciech Iżykowski in 2013:
19 + 4244193265542951705·17#·n, for n = 0 to 18.

It follows from widely believed conjectures, such as Dickson's conjecture and some variants of the prime k-tuple conjecture, that if p > 2 is the smallest prime not dividing a, then there are infinitely many AP-(p−1) with common difference a. For example, 5 is the smallest prime not dividing 6, so there is expected to be infinitely many AP-4 with common difference 6, which is called a sexy prime quadruplet. When a = 2, p = 3, it is the twin prime conjecture, with an "AP-2" of 2 primes (b, b + 2).

 Minimal primes in AP 

We minimize the last term.

 Largest known primes in AP 
For prime q, q# denotes the primorial 2·3·5·7·...·q.

, the longest known AP-k is an AP-27. Several examples are known for AP-26. The first to be discovered was found on April 12, 2010 by Benoît Perichon on a PlayStation 3 with software by Jarosław Wróblewski and Geoff Reynolds, ported to the PlayStation 3 by Bryan Little, in a distributed PrimeGrid project:
43142746595714191 + 23681770·23#·n, for n = 0 to 25. (23# = 223092870) 

By the time the first AP-26 was found the search was divided into 131,436,182 segments by PrimeGrid and processed by 32/64bit CPUs, Nvidia CUDA GPUs, and Cell microprocessors around the world.

Before that, the record was an AP-25 found by Raanan Chermoni and Jarosław Wróblewski on May 17, 2008:
6171054912832631 + 366384·23#·n, for n = 0 to 24. (23# = 223092870)

The AP-25 search was divided into segments taking about 3 minutes on Athlon 64 and Wróblewski reported "I think Raanan went through less than 10,000,000 such segments" (this would have taken about 57 cpu years on Athlon 64).

The earlier record was an AP-24 found by Jarosław Wróblewski alone on January 18, 2007:
468395662504823 + 205619·23#·n, for n = 0 to 23.
For this Wróblewski reported he used a total of 75 computers: 15 64-bit Athlons, 15 dual core 64-bit Pentium D 805, 30 32-bit Athlons 2500, and 15 Durons 900.

The following table shows the largest known AP-k with the year of discovery and the number of decimal digits in the ending prime. Note that the largest known AP-k may be the end of an AP-(k+1). Some record setters choose to first compute a large set of primes of form c·p#+1 with fixed p, and then search for AP's among the values of c that produced a prime. This is reflected in the expression for some records. The expression can easily be rewritten as a·n + b.

 Consecutive primes in arithmetic progression Consecutive primes in arithmetic progression refers to at least three consecutive primes which are consecutive terms in an arithmetic progression. Note that unlike an AP-k, all the other numbers between the terms of the progression must be composite. For example, the AP-3 {3, 7, 11} does not qualify, because 5 is also a prime.

For an integer k ≥ 3, a CPAP-k''' is k consecutive primes in arithmetic progression. It is conjectured there are arbitrarily long CPAP's. This would imply infinitely many CPAP-k for all k. The middle prime in a CPAP-3 is called a balanced prime. The largest known  has 15004 digits.

The first known CPAP-10 was found in 1998 by Manfred Toplic in the distributed computing project CP10 which was organized by Harvey Dubner, Tony Forbes, Nik Lygeros, Michel Mizony and Paul Zimmermann. This CPAP-10 has the smallest possible common difference, 7# = 210. The only other known CPAP-10 as of 2018 was found by the same people in 2008.

If a CPAP-11 exists then it must have a common difference which is a multiple of 11# = 2310. The difference between the first and last of the 11 primes would therefore be a multiple of 23100. The requirement for at least 23090 composite numbers between the 11 primes makes it appear extremely hard to find a CPAP-11. Dubner and Zimmermann estimate it would be at least 1012 times harder than a CPAP-10.

 Minimal consecutive primes in AP 

The first occurrence of a CPAP-k is only known for k ≤ 6 .

 Largest known consecutive primes in AP 
The table shows the largest known case of k consecutive primes in arithmetic progression, for k = 3 to 10.xd is a d''-digit number used in one of the above records to ensure a small factor in unusually many of the required composites between the primes.
x106 = 115376 22283279672627497420 78637565852209646810 56709682233916942487 50925234318597647097 08315833909447378791
x153 = 9656383640115 03965472274037609810 69585305769447451085 87635040605371157826 98320398681243637298 57205796522034199218 09817841129732061363 55565433981118807417 = x253 % 379#
x253 = 1617599298905 320471304802538356587398499979 836255156671030473751281181199 911312259550734373874520536148 519300924327947507674746679858 816780182478724431966587843672 408773388445788142740274329621 811879827349575247851843514012 399313201211101277175684636727

See also 
Cunningham chain
Szemerédi's theorem
PrimeGrid
Problems involving arithmetic progressions

Notes

References 
Chris Caldwell, The Prime Glossary: arithmetic sequence, The Top Twenty: Arithmetic Progressions of Primes and The Top Twenty: Consecutive Primes in Arithmetic Progression, all from the Prime Pages.

Jarosław Wróblewski, How to search for 26 primes in arithmetic progression?
P. Erdős and P. Turán, On some sequences of integers, J. London Math. Soc. 11 (1936), 261–264.

Prime numbers